Josef Pekarek (2 January 1913 – 30 November 1991) was a footballer who played international football for both Austria and Germany. He played as a midfielder for 1. Wiener Neustädter SC and SC Wacker Wien.

References

1913 births
1991 deaths
Austrian footballers
Austria international footballers
German footballers
Germany international footballers
Dual internationalists (football)
1. Wiener Neustädter SC players
FC Admira Wacker Mödling players
Association football midfielders